Radoslav Aleksandrov Tsonev (born on 29 April 1995) is a Bulgarian professional footballer who plays as a midfielder for Arda Kardzhali. He is a twin brother of Borislav Tsonev.

Club career
Radoslav made his first team debut in a 3–0 league win over Montana on 27 May 2011, coming on as a substitute for Darko Tasevski. He signed his first professional contract with the club on 29 April 2013.

Tsonev scored his first goal for Levski in the Eternal derby of Bulgarian football against CSKA Sofia on 21 April 2014.

On 25 January 2020, he joined Monopoli on loan for the rest of the 2019–20 season.

In the summer of 2020, Tsonev along with his twin brother Borislav returned to Levski. He remained there for the following two seasons. During the first of these two seasons, the two brothers were the leaders of Levski, gaining somewhat of a cult status among fans due to their loyalty to the club in times of financial hardship. Following the appointment of Stanimir Stoilov in September 2021, Tsonev progressively lost his place in the starting eleven. During the spring phase of the 2021-22 season Tsonev featured rarely on the pitch. His contract was not renewed.

In August 2022, Tsonev returned to his boyhood club Pirin Blagoevgrad.

International career
He made his debut for the Bulgaria national football team on 12 October 2021 in a World Cup qualifier against the Northern Ireland.

Honours

Club
Levski Sofia
 Bulgarian Cup (1): 2021–22

Statistics

Club

References

External links
 
 Profile at LevskiSofia.info

1995 births
Living people
Bulgarian footballers
Bulgarian expatriate footballers
Bulgaria youth international footballers
Bulgaria under-21 international footballers
Bulgaria international footballers
OFC Pirin Blagoevgrad players
PFC Levski Sofia players
FC Botev Vratsa players
U.S. Lecce players
U.S. Viterbese 1908 players
S.S. Monopoli 1966 players
FC Arda Kardzhali players
First Professional Football League (Bulgaria) players
Second Professional Football League (Bulgaria) players
Serie C players
Association football midfielders
Bulgarian twins
Twin sportspeople
Sportspeople from Blagoevgrad
Bulgarian expatriate sportspeople in Italy
Expatriate footballers in Italy